Kathleen Kelly Martin (born July 14, 1947) is an American writer of romance novels under the pen names of Kat Martin, Kathy Lawrence and Kasey Marx. She is married to writer and photographer Larry Jay Martin.

Biography
Martin was born in the Central Valley of California. She obtained a degree in Anthropology and also studied History at the University of California, Santa Barbara.

She lives with her husband, writer and photographer Larry Jay Martin in Missoula, Montana. They have collaborated on a book under the pseudonym of Kathy Lawrence.

Martin is a member of the Romance Writers of America. To date, she has been published in England, Spain, Italy, Greece, Germany, Norway, Sweden, Bulgaria, Russia, South Africa, China, and Korea.

Bibliography

As Kat Martin

Single novels
 Magnificent Passage (1988)
 Dueling Hearts (1989)
 Captain's Bride (1990)
 Lover's Gold (1991)
 Bold Angel (1994)
 The Dream (1995)
 Midnight Rider (1996)
 Christmas Angel in This is the Season (1997) & in Five Golden Rings (2000)
 Night Secrets (1999)
 The Secret (2001)
 Hot Rain (2002)
 Secret Ways (2003)

Southern series
 Creole Fires (1992)
 Savannah Heat (1993)
 Natchez Flame (1994)

Garrick family series (Lords Trilogy Series)
 Gypsy Lord (1992)
 Sweet Vengeance (1993)
 Devil's Prize (1995)

Kingsland series
 Innocence Undone (1997)
 Dangerous Passions (1998)

Litchfield series
 Nothing but Velvet (1997)
 Silk and Steel (2000)

Clayton series
 Wicked Promise (1998)
 Perfect Sin (2000)

Heartless series
 Heartless (2001)
 The Fire Inside (2001)
 Fanning the Flame (2002)

Heart Series
 Heart of Honor  (2007)
 Heart of Fire (2008)
 Heart of Courage (2009)

Sinclair sisters series
 Midnight Sun (2003)
 Desert Heart (2004)
 Deep Blue (2005)

Necklace series
 The Bride Necklace (2005)
 The Devil's Necklace (2005)
 The Handmaiden's Necklace (2006)

The Bride Trilogy
 Royal's Bride (2009)
 Reese's Bride (Jan 2010)
 Rule's Bride (May 2010)

The Raines of Wind Canyon
 Against the Wind (January 2011)
 Against the Fire (February 2011)
 Against the Law (March 2011)
 Against the Storm (November 2011)
 Against the Night (March 2012)
 Against the Sun (June 2012)
 Against the Odds (March 2013)
 Against the Edge (April 2013)
 Against the Mark (August 2013)
 Against the Wild (May 2014)

As Kathy Lawrence (with Larry Jay Martin)

Single novel
 Tin Angel (1989)

As Kasey Mars

Single novels
 The Silent Rose'' (1995)

References and resources
 Kathleen Kelly Martin's Official Website

External links
 Kat Martin's Webpage in Fantastic Fiction Website

Living people
1947 births
20th-century American novelists
21st-century American novelists
American romantic fiction writers
American women novelists
Writers from California
Women romantic fiction writers
20th-century American women writers
21st-century American women writers